Posht-e Bam or Posht Bam may refer to:
 Posht Bam, Kohgiluyeh and Boyer-Ahmad
 Posht-e Bam, North Khorasan